Tavakkul Bayramov (born June 27, 1981 in Baku, Azerbaijani SSR) is an Azerbaijani taekwondo athlete.

External links
 The-Sports.org
 

1981 births
Living people
Azerbaijani male taekwondo practitioners
European Taekwondo Championships medalists
World Taekwondo Championships medalists
21st-century Azerbaijani people